Burroughs School may refer to:

Burroughs School (Conway, South Carolina) - listed on the National Register of Historic Places
John Burroughs School - a private, non-sectarian preparatory school 
Nannie Helen Burroughs School - formerly the National Training School for Women and Girls
John Burroughs High School - a public high school located in Burbank, California 
John Burroughs Middle School (Los Angeles) - a public middle school in Hancock Park, Los Angeles, California 
Sherman E. Burroughs High School - a public high school located in Ridgecrest, CA
Burrough Green Primary School - a primary school in South Cambridgeshire